Garstang is a civil parish in the Wyre district of Lancashire, England.  It contains 17 listed buildings that are recorded in the National Heritage List for England.  All the listed buildings are designated at Grade II, the lowest of the three grades, which is applied to "buildings of national importance and special interest".  The parish includes the market town of Garstang, and all the listed buildings are in the town.  These include a medieval cross base, a former slaughterhouse, houses and shops, a church with associated structures, the former town hall, a former grammar school, public houses, a milestone, and a boundary stone.  The Lancaster Canal passes through the parish, and two bridges crossing it are listed.


Buildings

References

Citations

Sources

Lists of listed buildings in Lancashire
Buildings and structures in the Borough of Wyre
Listed buildings in